Maskinongé was a federal electoral district in Quebec, Canada, that was represented in the House of Commons of Canada from 1867 to 1925.

It was created by the British North America Act, 1867, and was amalgamated into the Berthier—Maskinongé electoral district in 1924.

Members of Parliament

This riding elected the following Members of Parliament:

Election results

  
|Nationalist Conservative
|Frédéric Houde||align=right|838 

  
|Nationalist Conservative
|Frédéric Houde||align=right|1,084 

By-election: On Mr. Houde's death, 15 November 1884

By-election: On Mr. Legris being called to the Senate, 10 February 1903

See also 

 List of Canadian federal electoral districts
 Mauricie
 Past Canadian electoral districts

External links
Riding history from the Library of Parliament

Former federal electoral districts of Quebec